Bitter Lake is a lake in the Trent River and Lake Ontario drainage basins located in the municipality of Dysart et al, Haliburton County, Ontario, Canada, about  northwest of the community of Haliburton.

There are no significant inflows. The primary outflow is an unnamed creek that flows through Tedious Lake to the Redstone River, a tributary of the Gull River.

See also
List of lakes in Ontario

References

Lakes of Haliburton County